Manchester (sometimes known as Mansfield) was a mining town in the southern Big Sur region of Monterey County, California from about 1875 to 1895. The town was reached by a  road from King City to Jolon. Prospecting began in the area in the 1850s. In the spring of 1887, after 10 years of various success, William Dugay Cruikshank discovered lode gold at the head of Alder Creek. He opened the Last Chance Mine, later known as the Buclimo Mine. The Last Chance mine produced about $62,000 in gold ore. The mines were not very productive, and most mining activity ceased by about 1895. Renewed attempts at exploiting the ore in the early 1900s failed. Cruickshank lived on the site of the town until his death in 1937.

Los Burros Mining District 

The history of Manchester is intertwined with the rise and fall of the Los Burros Mining District. It was defined as:

Difficult access 

From there an  wagon road was built to the Wagon Caves in the upper San Antonio Valley, a resting point and overnight camp site for those traveling to and from the coast. At Wagon Cave, travelers switched from horseback to and from wagons stored there for the purpose of hauling items to market and provisions back from Soledad. There were two trails from Wagon Caves to the coast: the Plaskett/Mansfield Trail to the north, and the Los Burros Trail to the south. Over the Los Burros Trail, it was a  hike to the summit of the Santa Lucia Mountains, followed by a  downhill trek to the mines. To the west of Manchester, a few families homesteaded the region around what is known as Lopez Point (known today as  near Lucia), including the Harlan, Dani, Gamboa, and Lopez families.

Gold discovery 

William T. Cruikshank, born in Troy, New York, arrived in California with his father Arnold in 1849. William and his wife Sarah Ann (nee French) were living in Contra Costa County in 1867. Their son William Dugay Cruikshank was born in Fresno County in 1855. The father and son moved to the Manchester area in 1872. They searched for gold along with others. At a miner's meeting on February 5, 1875, the Los Burros Mining District was organized. H. C. Dodge was elected Chairman, A.C. Frazier, Secretary, and William T. Cruikshank Recorder. During the next 12 years, 131 mining claims were recorded.

The most valuable gold discovery was made by William Dugay Cruikshank, on March 24, 1887, who called his find the Last Chance mine. Cruickshank found five veins which milled at an average of $200 per ton. During the first year of the mining district, 63 claims were recorded. In 1889 the Manchester Mine was dug about  into the mountain; the Melville Mine had a tunnel about long.

Eventually around 500 claims existed. Many Los Burros mines were registered and renamed, likely filed under several different names. Placer claims were filed along Plaskett Creek, Willow Creek and tributaries, and Alder Creek. Cruikshank, who partnered with James Krinkle, shipped an estimated $62,000 in gold ore from the Last Chance Mine.  Since there was no road into the area, the crushed gold ore was sacked and transported on donkeys (hence, los burros) over the Santa Lucia Mountains to the Nacimiento River.

Mining equipment like the ore crushers and stamp mills were brought by ship to Cape San Martin and off-loaded. Cruickshank built hoisting works and a 10-stamp mill which began operating on November 29, 1889.

Another flurry of activity occurred in the early 1900s when placer gold was discovered in gravel and alluvial deposits along various forks of Willow Creek. The entire Willow Creek watershed was prospected, and a large number of pits, shafts, tunnels, open cuts, and adits were explored by miners. The mines were not very productive, and most mining activity ceased by about 1895. Between 1900 and 1909, another 322 claims were filed there. Intermittent small-scale prospecting and development work have continued in the district until the present time. There was a recorded production of several hundred dollars worth of gold in 1953 and again in 1963. It is believed that 2000 or more claims have been located in the district.

Geology 

Dark sandstone is most abundant and is also the chief host rock of the gold-bearing deposits. Also present are chert, shale, serpentine, and volcanic rocks. Most of the gold has been recovered from small lenticular ore shoots in oxidized zones near the surface. The sulfides, which consist of fine-grained pyrite and small amounts of chalcopyrite and arsenopyrite generally, are low in gold content. Most of the placer gold has come from Willow Creek, and much of it was concentrated as coarse ragged fragments. Very small amounts have been found in Alder, Plaskett, and Salmon creeks.

Mineral production 

The mining occurred in three nearly parallel quartz veinlets, parallel to a layer of sandstone. The gold was removed via open cuts, shafts, and drift tunnels. In 1902, large gold nuggets were found on Spruce Creek and placer gold was found in Willow Creek. Ancona, Buclimo $62,000; Bushnell, Gorda, Grizzly, Mariposa, Melville, New York, Plaskett (placer) $18,000; Spruce (placer) $22,000. The value of the total output is estimated to be about $150,000.

Town history 

Manchester was located a few hundred yards downhill from the Last Chance mine.  The Mansfield post office was established in Manchester on September 14, 1889. The name Mansfield was given to the post office because Manchester had already been assigned to Manchester in northern California. The post office closed in 1897. E.S. Harrison, author or "Monterey County", published in 1890, reported that 100 people lived in Manchester. A petition to build a road to the mines was put before the county Board of Supervisors in January 1890, but never advanced.

In October 1889, a visitor reported "9 or 10 frame houses at Mansfield, among them two boarding houses and four saloons." The town had three stamp mills, four stores, five saloons, a dance hall, restaurant, hotel, a barber shop, post office, blacksmith, a small one-room school, mess halls, bunkhouses, a few cabins, a cemetery, and a dance hall. The school was established in July 1890, when Susie R. Bird was hired as its first teacher. About 350 people lived in the town at the height of its popularity.

Fires  

A fire destroyed the town in late 1890. Portions were rebuilt, but by 1895 the boom had begun to fade.  Additional fires destroyed most traces of the town with the exception of the remnants of the stamp mills. In September 1970, the Buckeye fire burned through most of the Los Burros Mining District and destroyed nearly all of the remaining miners shacks and cabins. The US Forest Service later destroyed any that remained.

Cruikshank dies 

In 1937, 81-year-old William D. "Billy" Cruikshank went missing while traveling the trail between his cabin in Manchester and Jolon. When it was discovered that Cruikshank had not been seen since November 16, the sheriff organized a posse on December 15 to look for him. His body was never found. The Cruikshank Trail, Lower Cruikshank Camp, and Upper Cruikshank Camp in the Silver Peak Wilderness are named for him.

References 

Big Sur